Marius Rath (born May 27, 1970) is a former Norwegian ice hockey player. He was born in Oslo, Norway and played for the club Vålerengens IF. He played for the Norwegian national ice hockey team at the 1992 and 1994 Winter Olympics.

References

1970 births
Living people
Ice hockey players at the 1992 Winter Olympics
Ice hockey players at the 1994 Winter Olympics
Norwegian ice hockey players
Olympic ice hockey players of Norway
Ice hockey people from Oslo
Vålerenga Ishockey players